CrossAsia is an internet portal offering access to printed and electronic resources concerning Asian studies to individuals affiliated to a German institution which is part of the  (Blue Loan Service). CrossAsia is being created and supervised by the East Asia Department of Berlin State Library, until 2015 the responsible library for East- and Southeast Asia (6,25) within the special research collection programme of the German Research Foundation. Information is presented as well in Latin as in Asian script.

Co-operative partners (until 2013) 
GIGA, the German Leibniz Institute of Global and Area Studies in Hamburg, 
the Institute of Chinese Studies of the Heidelberg University, 
the Göttingen State and University Library 
the Institute of Japanese Studies of the University of Tübingen
the Institute of Chinese and Korean Studies of the Tübingen University
the Central Network GVK 
the China World Wide Web Virtual Library (Internet Guide for Chinese Studies)

The project is supported and funded by the German Research Foundation (DFG). Until 2011 CrossAsia was member of the interdisciplinary portal vascoda.

These are the main features of CrossAsia 
Meta-search: a virtual subject catalogue allows simultaneous searchability in relevant German and international library catalogues and databases in modern Western and Asian languages and scripts
Online Guide East Asia (OGEA): gives access to qualified, intellectually selected and commented electronic resources, mostly internet based. Specialist browsing and search through filter options is possible. 
Possibility for registered users in Germany to access a wide range of licensed bibliographic and full-text databases offered by CrossAsia, these being:




 (Chinese Ancient Texts)

 (The Complete Classics Collection of Ancient China)
Dissertations of China
Policies and Laws of China



 (Database of the National People's Congress)
 (Chinese People's Political Consultative Conference Document Database)
 (Database of the Chinese Government)
 (Database of the Communist Party of China)
LawInfoChina

JapanKnowledge
 (Nikkei Telecom21)
RISS International

China Academic Journals
China Online Journals
 (Taiwan Electronic Periodical Services)
 (GeNII)
 (CiNII)
Apabi E-Books Collection
 (National Index to Chinese Newspapers & Periodicals)
Online Contents East and South-East Asia
Online Contents Asia and North Africa
Online Contents South Asia
MagazinePlus
BookPlus
　(Policy Information Platform)
 (Jitsu)
Online Contents Asia and North Africa, East and South-East Asia, and South Asia: listing articles from several hundred journals, mostly in Western languages. The user is in many cases guided directly from the bibliographic record to the full text.

References

External links 
CrossAsia 
Staatsbibliothek zu Berlin - Preußischer Kulturbesitz 
East Asia Department - Staatsbibliothek zu Berlin - PK 
Internet Guide for Chinese Studies (IGCS) 
Deutsche Forschungsgemeinschaft (DFG) 
vascoda

East Asia
Geographic region-oriented digital libraries
South Asia
German digital libraries